The 1996 Senior British Open was a professional golf tournament for players aged 50 and above and the tenth British Senior Open Championship, held from 25 to 28 July at Royal Portrush Golf Club in Portrush, County Antrim, Northern Ireland, United Kingdom.

In 2018, the tournament was, as all Senior British Open Championships played 1987–2002, retroactively recognized as a senior major golf championship and a PGA Tour Champions (at the time named the Senior PGA Tour) event.

Brian Barnes won by three strokes over Bob Charles and David Oakley to successfully defend his title from 1995 and win his second Senior British Open title and senior major championship victory.

Venue

The event was the second Senior Open Championship in a row held at Royal Portrush Golf Club.

Field
105 players entered the competition. One of them withdraw. 61 players, all of them professionals, no amateurs, made the 36-hole cut and one of them was disqualified.

Past champions in the field
Seven past Senior British Open champions participated. Six of them made the 36-hole cut. Bobby Verway missed the cut by one shot.

Past winners and runners-up at The Open Championship in the field 
The field included two former winners of The Open Championship, Bob Charles (tied 2nd) and Gary Player (tied 14th).

The field also included three former runners-up at The Open Championship. Neil Coles (9th), Brian Huggett (tied 18th) and Christy O'Connor Snr (tied 32nd).

Final results 
Sunday, 28 July 1996

Source:

References

External links 
 Results on European Tour website

Senior major golf championships
Golf tournaments in Northern Ireland
Senior British Open
Senior British Open
Senior British Open